Michael Lesslie (born December 1983) is a British playwright and screenwriter. He is best known for writing the screenplay for the 2016 film Assassin's Creed.

Life and career

He was educated at Harrow School, then studied English Language and Literature at Exeter College, Oxford, where he received a double first.

In 2005 he wrote a short film, Heavy Metal Drummer, which was nominated for a BAFTA Award.

His play Prince of Denmark, a Hamlet prequel, was premiered in 2011 by the National Youth Theatre.

References

External links
IMDB

21st-century English male writers
21st-century British screenwriters
People educated at Harrow School
Alumni of Exeter College, Oxford
1983 births
Living people